The 2021 European Athletics Indoor Championships was held from 4 to 7 March 2021 at the Arena Toruń in Toruń, Poland. This was the second time this event was held in Poland after the 1975 edition in Katowice. The four-day competition featured 13 men's and 13 women's athletics events. Altogether 659 athletes from 46 countries participated in the event which is a record in the competition's history. The Netherlands topped the medal table for the first time with four gold, one silver and two bronze medals.  Katarzynka, a gingerbread, was the mascot.

Schedule
All times are local (UTC+1).

 Thursday, 4 March

 Friday, 5 March

 Saturday, 6 March

 Sunday, 7 March

Men's results

Track

Field

Combined

Women's results

Track

Field

Combined

Medal table

Participating nations

 (2)
 (1)
 (2)
 (1)
 (7)
 (1)
 (22)
 (30)
 (3)
 (7)
 (4)
 (3)
 (21)
 (15)
 (7)
 (19)
 (25)
 (3)
 (46)
 (42)
 (19)
 (21)
 (23)
 (2)
 (43)
 (1)
 (2)
 (9)
 (4)
 (1)
 (2)
 (31)
 (1)
 (12)
 (36)
 (16)
 (15)
 (1)
 (8)
 (7)
 (13)
 (36)
 (29)
 (23)
 (13)
 (30)

See also
 Italy at the 2021 European Athletics Indoor Championships

References

External links
Official website
Results book

 
European Athletics Indoor Championships
European Athletics Indoor Championships
European Athletics Indoor Championships
Sport in Toruń
International athletics competitions hosted by Poland
European Athletics